GND may refer to:

 Graduated neutral density filter
 Green New Deal
 Ground (electricity)
  (Integrated Authority File)
 Maurice Bishop International Airport in Grenada
 Zulgo-Gemzek language, spoken in Cameroon
 Gabriel Nadeau-Dubois, a politician in Quebec